Jacob (or Jaak, or Jacques) van Thienen (also called van Gobertingen)<ref
 name=JVG-JVT>Sidenote: Gobertingen, is a hamlet (in Dutch, Gobertange in French) of the former municipality of Mélin (Malen in Dutch) that now belongs to Jodoigne (Geldenaken in Dutch), where some of the original Dutch-language placenames like Dongelberg still occur in present-day local French language. Architect and Master Mason Van Thienen was familiar with in the area of his edifices most common sandstone types named after their places of origin, Gobertingen and Balegem. Before Jaak became the Master Mason, he and Hendrik van Gobertingen assisted Jean d'Oisy at the Church of Our Lady at the Pool in the city of Tienen (formerly spelled Thienen). Dutch-language surnames formed like Van Thienen and Van Gobertingen are very common. A person from the small place Gobertingen would have stated that place of origin while still near it, but the nearest city, 'Thienen', when somewhat further away such as in Brussels, and would then be referred to by that predicate. Working in Tienen, Jaak and Hendrik may have come from the same nearby village, and Jaak's varying surname indicates that a localizing instead of an already estasblished family name may have been used.</ref> was a Flemish architect of the early 15th century (the dates of his birth and death are unknown). He is believed to have designed the spectacular Brussels Town Hall (Hôtel de Ville) circa 1402. This Gothic building, which stands in the city's Grand-Place, is widely regarded as a masterpiece of medieval European secular architecture.  The building's distinctive belfry was, however, the work of a different architect, Jan van Ruysbroeck.

Van Thienen may also have built the southern aisle of the Saint Michael and Saint Gudula Cathedral in Brussels, around 1400.

References
General:  (Source declared references)

Gothic architects
Burgundian Netherlands architects
1410 deaths
Year of birth unknown